McFarland Heights, a neighborhood in Florence in Lauderdale County, Alabama, was listed on the National Register of Historic Places in 2017 as a historic district.

According to the Alabama Historical Commission: "McFarland Heights Historic District in Florence, Lauderdale County, is located on a bluff overlooking the Tennessee River.  The neighborhood developed as Florence's first exclusive suburban development. Built over a period of about 45 years, (1920-1966) McFarland Heights has a wealth of high style buildings, most of which maintain their historic integrity.  The houses reflect the transition from pre- to post-World War II suburban American architecture, with one notable dwelling designed by Frank Lloyd Wright."

The Rosenbaum House is the Wright work.

References

Historic districts on the National Register of Historic Places in Alabama
National Register of Historic Places in Lauderdale County, Alabama